Romi Meitei (born 19 September 1976) is an Indian film director and lyricist who works in Manipuri films. He is a recipient of several awards at several film festivals organised in India and abroad and has directed movies for around two decades. Thoiba Thoibi, Inga Nonglakta, Manithoiba, Natephamda Tero, Chumthang Makhong, Mikithi and Dharmagi Mingda Imagidamak are some of the well-known movies he directed.

He has also made films which are adaptations of famous radio plays and Shumang Kumheis. Imagi Laman Singamdre, Yotpi, Sanagi Nga, Sangbrei Managi Chenghi Manam, Hiktharaba Samji: Pizza are among such films.

In 2017, he directed a music video titled Nura Pakhang. It is a Portuguese and Meitei language collaboration music video on present situation of Manipuri pony. As of 2022, his feature film Eikhoigi Yum Won FIPRESCI International Federation of Film Critics Award for the best International Film and NETPAC Network for the Promotion of Asian Cinema Jury Special Mention at the 27IFFK https://www.iffk.in/.

Accolades
Romi Meitei has won many awards for his feature and non-feature films. His 2013 movie Tabunungda Akaiba Likli swept many awards at the SSS MANIFA 2014. Noong Amadi Yeroom, his 2011 non-feature film received official selection in 42nd IFFI (International film festival of India), Indian Panorama, MIFF 2012 International competition, 2nd Best Film in Manhattan Short Film Festival and Official selection at Beyond Bollywood festival, Frankfurt. Eesing Gi Machu won the Best Film at the Brahmaputra Valley Film Festival 2016.

Yours Faithfully got official selection at Global Cinema festival by Film Federation of India. His 2019 non-feature film Motsillaba Mingsel bagged the Special Jury award at the 13th Manipur State Film Awards 2020. The film also won the Best Director and Best Child Artist awards at the Cochin International Shortfilm Awards 2021. Motsillaba Mingsel won the Grand Jury Award for Best Film and House of Illusion Award for Best Short Fiction at the Chalachitram National Film Festival 2021, held under aegis of Directorate of Film Festival and Cultural Department, Government of Assam. The film also won the Best Short Film Award at The Himalayan Film Festival 2021 held in Leh, Ladakh. His film Eikhoigi Yum won the Best Feature Film award at the 14th Manipur State Film Festival 2022.

Social work
Romi Meitei also contributes to social works. He is the Chairman of Mami Thawan Foundation, a non-profit foundation which provides services for the welfare of Manipur Society.

Filmography

Selected feature films

Non-feature films

References

External links
 Romi Meitei Interview

Living people
Film directors from Manipur
Indian film directors
Meitei people
People from Imphal East district
1976 births
Shumang Kumhei artists